Delpirou is a surname. Notable people with the surname include:

 Cécile Delpirou (born 1964), French politician
 Marthe Delpirou (1900–1945), French lawyer and resistance fighter

See also
 Delairea

Surnames of French origin